The Molson Bank (sometimes labeled Molsons Bank) was a Canadian bank founded in Montreal, Quebec, by brothers William (1793–1875) and John Molson, Jr. (1787–1860), the sons of brewery magnate John Molson.

History

In 1850, it was constituted under the Free Banking Act passed by the parliament of the Province of Canada. To increase its powers and its revenue, the bank was incorporated in 1855. It was granted a charter on May 19, 1855 in Montreal allowing it to operate its bank in the same way as other banks. With its head office at the corner of St. James & St. Peter streets (today known as Saint-Jacques and Saint-Pierre streets) in Montreal, it continued in operation until 1925 when it merged with the Bank of Montreal.

Branches
The bank operated 125 branches primarily in Quebec and Ontario. It also had branches in western Canada and agents in the US and UK.

The Bank of Montreal at 3 King Street South, Waterloo, Ontario, is a former branch of the Molson Bank that was built in 1914 and is on the Registry of Historical Places of Canada.

Presidents
William Molson was the first President (1855-1875) and brother John Molson Jr. as vice-president (1855-1860). Other Molsons to work at the bank included:

 John Thomas Molson was President in 1875
 John Henry Robinson Molson, President 1889-1897
 Frederick William Molson(1860-1929) was President of the bank from 1921 to 1924

Gallery

See also
List of banks in Canada
Molson Bank Building, Montreal

References

Denison, Merrill, 1893–1975. Canada's first bank : a history of the Bank of Montreal. Toronto: McClelland and Stewart, c1966. 2 v. : ill., maps, ports., (some folded, some col). ; 25 cm.

Defunct banks of Canada
Companies based in Montreal
Molson family
Banks established in 1850
Banks disestablished in 1925
Bank of Montreal
1850 establishments in Quebec
1925 disestablishments in Quebec
Canadian companies established in 1850